Henry John Chitty Harper (28 December 1893) was an Anglican bishop in the second half of the 19th century.

Life
Harper was baptised on 9 January 1804, educated at The Queen's College, Oxford and ordained in 1832. He was Chaplain of Eton College until December 1840 then Vicar of St Mary's, Stratfield Mortimer. In 1856 he was appointed to the episcopate as Bishop of Christchurch. Harper and his family arrived on 23 December 1856 in Lyttelton on the Egmont. At the 4th General Synod, 14 October 1868, he was elected and upon receiving in July 1869 notice of Selwyn's resignation, he became Primate of New Zealand; he resigned the Primacy on 5 September 1889 and his See on 31 March 1890, in ill-health. He died on 28 December 1893 and is buried at Barbadoes Street Cemetery.

Family 
On 12 December 1829 at St Maurice, Winchester, Harper married Emily Wooldridge. They had 15 children. His eldest daughter, Emily Weddell Harper married the politician John Acland. Two of his other daughters married Charles Blakiston, son of Matthew Blakiston; and Charles George Tripp. A son, Leonard Harper, became a member of parliament, and Arthur Paul Harper was his grandson.

References

1804 births
Alumni of The Queen's College, Oxford
Anglican bishops of Christchurch
19th-century Anglican archbishops
Primates of New Zealand
1893 deaths
Burials at Barbadoes Street Cemetery
Henry